Cottonwood River may refer to one of four rivers in North America:

 Cottonwood River (Kansas), a tributary of the Neosho River
 Cottonwood River (Minnesota), a tributary of the Minnesota River
 Cottonwood River (Dease River tributary), originating in the northern Stikine Ranges of British Columbia
 Cottonwood River (Fraser River tributary), originating in Cariboo District, British Columbia, Canada
 Little Cottonwood River, a tributary of the Minnesota River

See also 
 Cottonwood (disambiguation)